Donato Tommaso Veraldi (born 12 January 1941, Soveria Simeri) is an Italian politician. He was a member of the European Parliament from 8 May 2006, when he took up a seat vacated after the 2006 Italian general election, until the 2009 European elections. He represented The Daisy within the ALDE parliamentary group.

References

1941 births
Living people
Presidents of Calabria
Democracy is Freedom – The Daisy MEPs
MEPs for Italy 2004–2009
21st-century Italian politicians
Christian Democracy (Italy) politicians
Italian People's Party (1994) politicians
Democracy is Freedom – The Daisy politicians